Barcombe was a railway station serving the village of Barcombe in East Sussex. It was part of the East Grinstead to Lewes line, part of which now makes up the Bluebell Railway. The station was originally opened as "New Barcombe" to distinguish it from the nearby station of Barcombe Mills (then called 'Barcombe') and was changed to its more usual name on 1 January 1885. In 1897 goods sidings were installed at a cost of £1450.

It was planned to close the line and the station on 13 June 1955, although they actually closed on 29 May due to a railway strike. The line closure was found to be illegal under the original acts authorising construction of the railway and British Railways were forced to reopen it in August 1956. However, the station was not reopened as it was not mentioned in the legislation.

After Parliament repealed the sections in question, the line was closed in March 1958 under the British Railways Branch-Line Report (prior to the Beeching Axe) and the track was lifted in 1960 from south of Sheffield Park to Culver Junction. Subsequently, Barcombe station building was sold and was converted into a private house. The platform edge is still visible but the trackbed has been infilled up to about one foot below platform level.

Despite the re-opening of part of the East Grinstead-Lewes line by the Bluebell Railway, an extension south from its headquarters at Sheffield Park seems improbable in the short term as the intermediate station, Newick and Chailey is now covered by housing, and several overbridges would have to be rebuilt.

Miscellaneous

Bernard Holden, former president of the Bluebell Railway, was born in Barcombe Station in 1908. His father was the station master at the time.

External links 
 Barcombe station at Subterranea Britannica

References 

Disused railway stations in East Sussex
Former London, Brighton and South Coast Railway stations
Railway stations in Great Britain opened in 1882
Railway stations in Great Britain closed in 1955
Thomas Myres buildings
railway station